IIIT Pune may refer to:
 Indian Institute of Information Technology, Pune
 International Institute of Information Technology, Pune